Morris Reservoir is located in the San Gabriel Mountains, within the Angeles National Forest, in Los Angeles County, California.

It is impounded by Morris Dam, which was completed in 1935.

Geography
Morris Reservoir is just downstream from the San Gabriel Dam.

Morris Reservoir Naval Weapons Test Site
The reservoir and its slopes were the Morris Reservoir Naval Weapons Test Site, a naval weapons test facility, from World War II through the 1990s. The reservoir was transferred to the Los Angeles County Department of Public Works in 1995.

The test facility was established by Caltech, which was developing weapons for the Navy at its Naval Ordnance Test Station (NOTS) at China Lake (town), near Ridgecrest, California. It today is now known as the Naval Air Weapons Station China Lake, and is still the primary proving ground for naval weapons systems. Because China Lake is a dry lake in the Mojave Desert, Caltech opened this substation at the Morris Reservoir, near their campus, north of Azusa in the San Gabriel Mountains.

This site was used especially for the development of submarine-based warfare systems, including torpedoes, bombs, and submarine-launched missiles like the Polaris rocket, the first ballistic missile that could be launched from submerged submarines.

Most of the buildings at the site have been removed, and the site is being restored to a "natural" state, and may once again be open to the public.

See also
Reservoirs in Los Angeles County, California
List of lakes in California

References

External links

The Caltech Archives: Morris Dam reservoir, San Gabriel Mountains
Morris Dam Water Supply Enhancement Project Final Initial Study and Mitigated Negative Declaration
Morris Dam valve leakage photo
Morris Dam data

Reservoirs in Los Angeles County, California
San Gabriel Mountains
San Gabriel River (California)
Angeles National Forest
Azusa, California
Los Angeles County Department of Public Works
1935 establishments in California
Systems command installations of the United States Navy
Military facilities in Greater Los Angeles
1940s establishments in California
1990s disestablishments in California
Historic American Engineering Record in California
Reservoirs in California
Reservoirs in Southern California